The 2004–05 William & Mary Tribe men's basketball team represented The College of William & Mary during the 2004–05 college basketball season. This was head coach Tony Shaver's second season at William & Mary. The Tribe competed in the Colonial Athletic Association and played their home games at Kaplan Arena. They finished the season 8–21, 3–15 in CAA play and lost in the quarterfinals of the 2005 CAA men's basketball tournament to rivals Old Dominion after defeating James Madison in the preliminary round. They did not participate in any post-season tournaments.

References

William and Mary Tribe
William & Mary Tribe men's basketball seasons
William and Mary Tribe
William and Mary Tribe